Tenpa Yarphel is a Tibetan monk and politician. He is a member of the 16th Tibetan parliament-in-exile

Early life 
He was born in Kham area in eastern Tibet, and came to India in 2001. He attended Sera Je  Monastic University, and Sarah Institute of Higher Studies in 2004 and 2008. He worked as an editor at the Department of Religion and Culture in Central Tibetan Administration(CTA) during which he edited literature on history of more than 300 monasteries in Tibet.

Career 
Ven. Yarphel landed in the eye of controversy over comment on ill-effects of relying on  Nechung Oracle, which the monk claimed was an outdated, feudalistic  practice in the governing systems of the 21st century. This raised backlash from the highly pious Tibetan community. HH 17th Karmapa, the head of Kagyu sect of which the monk belonged, criticized the monk. Irate Tibetan groups demanded his resignation from Tibetan exile politics.

References

Year of birth missing (living people)
Living people
Tibetan politicians